Sircar is the surname of:

 Birendranath Sircar (1901–1980), Indian film producer and the founder of New Theatres, Calcutta
 Dineshchandra Sircar (1907–1985), Indian epigraphist, historian, numismatist and folklorist
 Joydeep Sircar (born 1947), Indian mountaineer and mountaineering historian
 Muhammad Jamiruddin Sircar (born 1931), former President of Bangladesh and Speaker of the Bangladesh National Assembly
 Nilratan Sircar (1861–1943), Indian doctor, educationist, philanthropist and swadeshi entrepreneur
 Shoojit Sircar (born c. 1967), 21st century Indian film director and producer
 Tiya Sircar (born 1982), American actress

See also
 Sarkar (disambiguation)
 Sorcar, a list of people from the same family